The Spitzhorli is a mountain of the Swiss Pennine Alps, located between the Nanztal and the Gantertal, south of Brig-Glis in the canton of Valais.

References

External links
 Spitzhorli on Hikr

Mountains of the Alps
Mountains of Switzerland
Mountains of Valais
Two-thousanders of Switzerland